JFA (Jodie Foster's Army) is an American hardcore punk band formed in 1981, with roots in Arizona and in Southern California skateboard culture. The original members include Brian Brannon (vocals), Don "Redondo" Pendleton (guitar), Michael Cornelius (bass), and Mike "Bam-Bam" Sversvold (drums). Alan Bishop of Sun City Girls also played bass for a time. The band was pivotal in the development of the skate punk and Skate Rock scenes. Over the years, the lineup has included many bass players and drummers but the core of Brannon and Redondo has remained constant.

History

Establishment
JFA was formed in April 1981, 19 days after the failed attempted assassination of Ronald Reagan by John Hinckley Jr. Hinckley, an obsessed fan of Jodie Foster and her portrayal of a teen prostitute in the 1976 Martin Scorsese film Taxi Driver, reportedly attempted to kill the President as a means of impressing the actress. The band's name was thus a dark play on Hinckley's attempt at murdering Reagan — a hated figure in the early 1980s punk rock scene.

Don Pendleton, then in the band The Deez, and Cornelius, then in the band Jr. Chemists, knew each other from shows around Phoenix, Arizona and from skateboarding. They began playing together after a D.O.A. concert during the band's Hardcore 81 tour. Bam-Bam later joined after meeting Pendleton at an "Industrial Dance" in Phoenix. Brian Brannon was pulled into the band by Cornelius who met him skateboarding and at punk shows.

The band's first show was opening for Black Flag at an Industrial Dance which was one of a series of early Phoenix punk shows. Their first song of the night was "Pipetruck", which combined elements of "Police Truck" by The Dead Kennedys and "Pipeline" by The Chantays.

As of 1984 all members of the band were from Arizona, except Pendleton (Huntington Beach, CA) and Cornelius (Bethesda, MD).

Recording history
Placebo Records released their debut EP Blatant Localism in late 1981. The band toured the west extensively and played many local shows. Their first national tour was in the summer of 1983 following the release of their first album Valley of the Yakes.

The original bassist, Michael Cornelius, left the band in the summer of 1984 prior to the nine-week summer '84 tour.  Alan Bishop of labelmates Sun City Girls played bass until Cornelius returned for the 1986 release Nowhere Blossoms.

The band received continuing coverage in the influential skateboard magazine Thrasher during the 1980s.  Brannon appeared on the April 1987 cover of Thrasher riding backside at the Love Bowl in Phoenix, Arizona. He also appeared on the cover of the April 1989 issue grinding a fakie layback thruster on the edge of the pipe at Thrasherland Skatepark in Glendale, Arizona. In 1990, Brannon took a full-time position as staff writer at Thrasher and eventually became music editor and art director of the magazine until he left in 1997. Throughout the 1980s, Brannon, Pendleton and Cornelius were Thrasher freelance contributors of articles and photographs.

Brian Brannon holds the rank of Master Chief Petty Officer in the United States Navy Reserve.

Current lineup 
 Brian Brannon – vocals, piano, organ
 Don "Redondo" Pendleton – guitar
 Corey Stretz – bass
 Jamie Reidling – drums

Discography
Blatant Localism 7", Placebo (1981)
Valley of the Yakes LP, Placebo (1983)
Untitled LP, Placebo (1984)
Mad Gardens 12", Placebo (1984)
Live 1984 Tour LP, Placebo (1985)
My Movie 7", Placebo (1986)
Nowhere Blossoms LP, Placebo (1988)
Lightnin' Storm/People's Revolutionary Party 7", Buzzkill (1991)
Camp Out/Travels With Charlie 7", Spontaneous Combustion (1995)
Secret Agent Man Split 7" with Jack Killed Jill, NRA (1996)
Only Live Once CD, Hurricane (1999)
We Know You Suck CD, Alternative Tentacles (2003)
Live in Chicago 7" with the Faction, Spontaneous Combustion (2003)
To All Our Friends LP, DC-Jam (2009)
Speed of Sound CD, DC-Jam (2012)

UK releases
Untitled 12", Fundamental UK
Valley of the Yakes 12", Fundamental UK

Music videos
 Live at CBGB's (1984)
 Pipetruck (1984)
 Wilson (2010)
 Danny Sargent's Trucks (2010)
 Skateboard Anarchy (2014)

Compilations
16 Hi-Fi Hits, vinyl, DC-Jam
All the Rage, Volume 2, GMD
All the Rage 2000, GMD
Amuck, Placebo
Best of Flipside, Flipside
Best of Rodney on the ROQ, Poshboy
Best of Smoke 7, Bomp
Bite the Bullet, Know
Blazing Wheels & Barking Trucks, Skate Rock No. 2, High Speed
Born to Skate, Skate Rock No. 4, High Speed
Buried Alive, Smoke 7
Concrete Waves, Disaster Records
Eastern Front, Enigma/Eastern Front
Explicit Skate Rock, Skate Rock No. 10, High Speed
Flipside Vinyl Fanzine, Flipside
For the Kids, Together
High Rollers, AZPX
Meathouse, cassette-only, Version Sound
More Coffee for the Politicians, Placebo
Old Skars & Upstarts, Disaster
Phenis, Phenis Fanzine
Pogo Strut Slam Swivel & Mosh, Devil Doll
Rat Music for Rat People, Vol. 2 (CD Presents, 1984)
Rodney on the ROQ, Volume 2, Poshboy
Scene Killer, Outsider
Sudden Death, Smoke 7
This is Phoenix, Not the Circle Jerks, Placebo
Thrasher Magazine Skate Rock No. 1, High Speed
VMLive, Series 2/Volume 2, VML
We Got Power, Mystic
Workers Comp, Recess
 Hardcore Breakout USA 1,2,3,..., (New Red Archives 2004)

Soundtracks
Damage, Think Skateboards Video (Phil Shao and Tim McKenney parts)
Griptape and Gasoline, Duke Video
High Rollers, AZPX
Hitting the Streets, Thrasher Magazine Video
Label Live!, Black Label Skateboards Video
Mt. Baldy Pipe segment, Bluetorch TV
Nude Bowl segment, Bluetorch TV
Pow Wow at Powell II, NSA Skate Video
Risk It, Santa Cruz Skate Video
Skatopia, Speed-Line Productions
Speed Freaks, Santa Cruz Speed Wheels Video
Strange Notes - Son! Get Down From There!, Santa Cruz Skateboards
Wheels of Fire, Santa Cruz Speed Wheels Video

Video games
Tony Hawk's Pro Skater 4

Skateboards
Brian Brannon Signature Model by AZPX Skateboards
JFA Boards by Factory 13
JFA Skateboards by Placebo Products (1980s)

See also
Ronald Reagan in music

References

External links
Official JFA web site
Maximumrocknroll Interview - JFA interview from 1983 (archived copy from March 15, 2010, retrieved from Internet Archive January 18, 2018)
Scanner zine interview - December 2009
1984 Guillotine Fanzine Interview - The Ragged Edge Collection @ Archive.org

Hardcore punk groups from California
Hardcore punk groups from Arizona
Skate punk groups